Brendan Evans (born April 8, 1986) is an American retired professional tennis player.

Tennis career

Juniors
On the junior circuit, Evans reached as high as No. 2 in the combined junior world rankings in July 2004, when he won the Australian Open, Wimbledon and US Open boys' doubles titles alongside Scott Oudsema. During his junior career, Evans posted win–loss records of 94–55 in singles and 103–32 in doubles.

Junior Slam results - Singles:

Australian Open: QF (2003, 2004)
French Open: SF (2004)
Wimbledon: QF (2003, 2004)
US Open: 2R (2001, 2002, 2003, 2004)

Junior Slam results - Doubles:

Australian Open: W (2004)
French Open: SF (2004)
Wimbledon: W (2004)
US Open: W (2004)

Nike deal
In 2001, Evans signed a 5-year endorsement deal with Nike at the age of 15 for a reported $1.25 million. At the time, the deal was one of the largest endorsement contracts for any junior tennis player.

Pro tour
After turning pro in 2004, Evans has competed on the ATP Challenger Tour and the ATP World Tour, both in singles and doubles. He reached his highest ATP singles ranking of world No. 117 in October 2009 and his highest ATP doubles ranking of world No. 119 in November 2007. He secured wins over top players Juan Martín del Potro, Kei Nishikori and John Isner. Evans is coached by former South African player Marcos Ondruska.

Top Spin 2 on Xbox 360
In 2006, Evans was featured as a character in the Xbox 360 video game Top Spin 2, along with fellow pro tour players Roger Federer, Andy Roddick and James Blake.

Career after tennis
Evans studied finance at The University of Virginia. Evans was named as one of the top tennis players in finance by Business Insider in 2014.

Junior Grand Slam finals

Doubles: 4 (3 titles, 1 runner-up)

ATP Challenger and ITF Futures finals

Singles: 10 (5–5)

Doubles: 22 (7–15)

Performance timeline

Singles

References

External links
 
 

1986 births
Living people
American male tennis players
Australian Open (tennis) junior champions
People from Wesley Chapel, Florida
Sportspeople from Pontiac, Michigan
Tennis people from Florida
Tennis people from Michigan
Wimbledon junior champions
US Open (tennis) junior champions
Grand Slam (tennis) champions in boys' doubles